Macalester College is a private liberal arts college in Saint Paul, Minnesota. Founded in 1874, Macalester is exclusively an undergraduate four-year institution and enrolled 2,174 students in the fall of 2018 from 50 U.S. states, four U.S territories, the District of Columbia and 97 countries. The college has Scottish roots and emphasizes internationalism and multiculturalism.

History
Macalester College was founded by Rev. Dr. Edward Duffield Neill in 1874 with help from the Presbyterian Church in Minnesota. Neill had served as a chaplain in the Civil War and traveled to Minnesota Territory in 1849. He became connected politically and socially. He went on to found two local churches, was appointed the first Chancellor of the University of Minnesota, and became the state's first superintendent of public education. In leaving the University of Minnesota Board of Regents he desired to build a religious college affiliated with the Presbyterian Church that would also be open to other Christian church members.

The college's original name was Baldwin College; it was affiliated with the Baldwin School, a Presbyterian secondary school. After a large donation from Charles Macalester, a prominent businessman and philanthropist from Philadelphia, the institution was renamed Macalester College. Macalester donated a hotel, the Winslow House, as the first permanent classroom building. With additional funding from the Presbyterian Church and its trustees, Macalester College opened for courses in 1885 with five teachers, six freshmen, and 52 preparatory students.

James Wallace joined the faculty in 1887 and later became president. He helped stabilize the college's finances and advance the institution. During his tenure, Macalester created a focus on a liberal arts curriculum. In 1897, Nellie A. Hope was the first woman appointed to the institution's newly organized music department.

In 2008 Macalester publicly launched a $150 million campaign. In 2009, construction was completed on Markim Hall, a new home for the Institute for Global Citizenship. Plans called for the building to qualify for Platinum certification under the Leadership in Energy and Environmental Design (LEED) system, a building rating system devised by the U.S. Green Building Council that evaluates structures' sustainability and environmental impact. In 2012, Macalester opened its renovated and expanded Janet Wallace Fine Arts Center.

In 2020, Suzanne M. Rivera became the college's 17th president; she is the first woman and first Hispanic person to serve in the role.

Academics

Rankings

In 2022 U.S. News & World Report ranked Macalester the 27th best liberal arts college in the United States, and tied at 16th for "Most Innovative", tied at 15th for "Best Undergraduate Teaching", tied at 13th for "Study Abroad", and 17th for "Best Value" national liberal arts college.

In 2019, Forbes rated it 86th out of 650 colleges, universities and service academies in the U.S., and 38th among liberal arts colleges.

In 2021, Washington Monthly ranked Macalester 12th among 215 liberal arts colleges in the U.S. based on its contribution to the public good as measured by social mobility, research, and promoting public service.

Macalester was named one of the Hidden Ivies for providing an education comparable to that of the Ivy League, based on academics, admissions process, financial aid, and student experience. Its most popular majors, based on 2021 graduates, were:
Biology/Biological Sciences (52)
Econometrics & Qualitative Economics (52)
Computer & Information Sciences (34)
Research & Experimental Psychology (32)
Political Science & Government (31)

Admissions
Macalester is considered "most selective" by the U.S. News & World Report rankings.

For the Class of 2026, Macalester received 9,622 applications and accepted 25% of applicants.

Faculty

Macalester has 188 full-time faculty, 94% of whom have a doctorate or the highest degree in their field. Twenty-nine percent of faculty are international or U.S. citizens of color. The student-faculty ratio is 10:1 and the average class size 17.

Academic program
Macalester offers over 800 courses and 39 majors. Students may also design their own interdisciplinary majors. Courses are available in the physical sciences, humanities, mathematics and computer sciences, arts, social sciences, foreign languages, classics, several interdisciplinary fields, and pre-professional programs. Pre-professional programs includes pre-law, pre-medical, a cooperative architecture program, and a cooperative engineering program. The most popular majors (in order) are economics, mathematics, biology, psychology, and political science.

The academic calendar at Macalester is divided into a 14-week fall semester (September to December) and a 14-week spring semester (January to May). All courses are offered for semester credit. Most courses are offered for four semester credits, but the amount of credit may vary.

During January, Macalester students may earn up to two semester credits in independent projects, internships, or Macalester-sponsored off-campus courses. They may also earn up to eight semester credits in independent study during the summer through independent projects or internships.

Study abroad and off-campus
Macalester College has a long tradition of providing opportunities for students to build an international and intercultural perspective into their college education through international or domestic off-campus study. Students may propose participation from among an array of overseas and domestic programs relevant to Macalester's liberal arts curriculum.

About 60% of Macalester students study abroad before graduation. Eleven departments require off-campus study for completion of a major.

Macalester has programs in the Netherlands, South Africa, Germany, Austria (e.g., at the University of Vienna), Singapore, and France.

Academic consortia memberships

Macalester is a member of the Associated Colleges of the Twin Cities (ACTC), a consortium of five liberal arts colleges in Saint Paul and Minneapolis formed to develop cooperative programs and offer cross-registration to their students. The other members are the University of St. Thomas, Augsburg University, Hamline University, and St. Catherine University. In addition to over 800 courses available on campus, Macalester students have access to all courses offered through the consortium without paying additional tuition. ACTC provides free busing among the campuses.

Macalester also has an agreement with the Minneapolis College of Art and Design (MCAD) whereby students may take one course per term there, provided that Macalester approves the course.

Tuition and financial aid
Macalester is committed to providing financial aid packages equal to the full demonstrated financial need of all admitted students. Two out of three Macalester students qualify for need-based financial aid. Macalester also provides merit-based scholarships to around half of all students (most also receive need-based aid). Its comprehensive tuition, room, and board fee for the 2021–22 academic year was $74,060.

Student life

Student body
Macalester is known for its high international enrollment for its institutional type as a percentage of its student body. As of fall 2018, international students constituted approximately 24% of the student body. Its 2,174 students come from 50 U.S. states, Washington D.C., Puerto Rico, the Mariana Islands and 97 countries; 31% of the U.S. student body are students of color. Macalester's student body is 40% male and 60% female.

Student organizations

Macalester has over 100 student clubs and organizations, including the college radio station WMCN, the Macalester Peace and Justice Committee, Chanter Literary and Arts Magazine, the Experimental College, Student Labor Action Coalition, African Music Ensemble, Macalester Gaming Society, Mac Anime, Macalester Mock Trial, Mac Dems, Mac GOP, Mac Greens, Fresh Concepts, Bad Comedy, The Macalester Review: A Political Magazine, The Hegemonocle Humor Magazine, a cappella groups including Scotch Tape, Sirens, Chromactics, Off Kilter, and The Trads; Cheeba, MacBrews, MacSlackers, MacBike, the Macalester Outing Club, the Macalester Climbing Club, Minnesota Public Interest Research Group (MPIRG), Macalester Conservation and Renewable Energy Society (MacCARES), Fossil Free Mac, Macalester International Organization (MIO), MacPlayers, NARAL Macalester Activists for Choice, Queer Union, Macalester Young Artists for Revolutionary Needlework (MacYARN), Macalester Quiz Bowl, Mac Rugby, Medicinal Melodies, the Physics and Astronomy Club, and Club Water Polo (Sons of Neptune).

The Mac Weekly 

The main campus newspaper is the student-run Mac Weekly, which has a circulation of up to 1,600 and was established in 1914. Almost all the newspaper staff works on a volunteer basis. Each semester the paper publishes 12 or 13 volumes, ranging from 12 to 24 pages. A satirical section, The Mock Weekly, appears in the last issue of each semester. The paper has published a magazine three times, in April 2006 and March and November 2007.

Civic engagement
Macalester is one of only 360 institutions that have been awarded the Carnegie Community Engagement Classification for excellence in civic engagement. Civic engagement is a core component of a Macalester education and is included in its mission statement. The college actively encourages student dialogue by bringing in speakers, hosting an International Roundtable to bring distinguished international scholars to discuss emerging global issues, and hosting collective meetings such as Women of Color.

Macalester links academic learning to community involvement. In 2011–12, 16 departments offered 59 courses with civic engagement components. Each year approximately 200 students complete internships, 65% of which are in the nonprofit sector, schools, government, or the arts. Macalester also allows students to earn their work-study financial aid award while working at a local nonprofit or elementary school.

Almost all students (96%) volunteer in the Twin Cities while at Macalester. Many student organizations encourage active civic engagement, including MPIRG, Maction, Queer Union (QU), Macalester Habitat for Humanity.

Macalester is the primary financial contributor and sponsor of the Minnesota Institute for Talented Youth, which was founded in 1967 and has its main facilities in the Lampert Building. MITY provides two different gifted education programs during the summer and one on weekends during the academic year. Macalester also participates in Project Pericles, a commitment to further encourage civic engagement at the college. In 2000, Macalester signed the Talloires Declaration, making a commitment to environmental sustainability, as well as a sweatshop pledge, making a commitment to fair-labor practices in the purchase of college apparel.

LGBTQ community
Macalester is widely recognized as one of the most LGBTQ-friendly colleges in the nation. The Campus Pride Index awarded Macalester a full five out of five stars for LGBTQ-friendly campuses. In 2007, The Princeton Review named Macalester the most gay-friendly college in the nation.

In order to be inclusive of all genders, Macalester has started an initiative to ensure access to single-stall and all-gender bathrooms across campus. It also offers all-gender housing on campus.

Macalester has a student-powered Gender and Sexuality Resource Center that aims to build a culture of resistance against all forms of oppression. It also has many active LGBTQ student organizations and groups, including Queer Union, the Trans Identity Collective, Allies Project Training, and the Macalester Out and Proud Community.

Athletics
Macalester's athletic teams are nicknamed the Scots. Macalester is a member of the NCAA Division III Minnesota Intercollegiate Athletic Conference (MIAC) in all sports. The Scots' football team set an NCAA Division III record by losing 50 straight games from 1974 to 1980. Earlham College broke that record in 2018, losing 51 straight games. In 1977, Macalester set a Division III record by allowing 59.1 points per game. The losing streak ended in dramatic fashion: Kicker Bob Kaye put a 23-yarder through the uprights with 11 seconds remaining in a September 1980 game as the Scots beat Mount Senario College. The Scots left the MIAC after the 2001 season and competed as independents until 2014, when they joined the Midwest Conference. Under head coach Tony Jennison, Macalester won the Midwest Conference title, the Scots' first conference football title since 1947. Macalester also won nine games in 2014, the most ever in a Scots season in their 121 years of intercollegiate football. The college actually dissolved the football program in 1906, pronouncing, according to The Mac Weekly: "Thoroughly aroused to the evils, real or imaginary, of this game, the public is clamoring for the entire abolition or reform on this 'relic of barbarism.'"

Soccer has always been a popular sport at Macalester. Both men's and women's teams remain competitive, appearing in multiple NCAA playoffs since 1995. The women's team won the NCAA championship in 1998. The 2010 men's team won the MIAC regular-season championship and both the men and women's teams received at-large bids for the 2010 NCAA Division III tournament. Both teams are well-supported by students, parents and alumni. Mental Floss cited one of Macalester sports fans' most (in)famous cheers–"Drink blood, smoke crack, worship Satan, go Mac!"–as one of "7 Memorable Sports Chants".

The cross-country skiing team became a club team in 2004, when skiing was eliminated as an MIAC-sanctioned sport. A women's hockey team formed in 2000 and continues to play at the club level.

Macalester Athletics compete in the Leonard Center, which opened in August 2008. The $45 million facility encompasses 175,000 square feet and includes a 200-meter track, a natatorium, a fitness center, several multipurpose rooms, and a health and wellness center. Materials from the former facility were disposed of in environmentally friendly ways, with some incorporated into the new structure.

The Macalester women's water polo team won its conference championship in 2017, 2018 and 2019.

Every year in early May, Macalester hosts the Al Storm Games, a competition between various athletes at Macalester consisting of various events such as a Hunger Games simulation.

Campus

Housing
As at many small liberal arts colleges, students at Macalester are required to live on campus for their first two years. The college began implementing limited all-gender housing options in 2007.

Residence halls
 Dupre Hall, which houses first-year students and sophomores, is on the corner of Summit and Snelling Avenues and was built in 1962. Renovated in 1994, Dupre houses about 260 students and is Macalester's largest residence hall.
 Turck Hall was built in 1957 and most recently remodeled in 2004. It houses nearly 180 first-year students.
 Doty Hall was built in 1964 and is one of two residence halls on campus with single-sex floors. In 2012, Doty 1 was designated the gender-neutral or all-gender floor.
 Bigelow Hall is on the corner of Grand Avenue and Macalester Street. Built in 1947 and remodeled in 1992, it is connected via tunnels to Wallace, Doty and 30 Macalester Street and has single-sex and coed floors. It is connected to Turck by skyway, and houses first-year students and sophomores.
 George Draper Dayton Hall (GDD) houses sophomores, juniors and seniors, typically in suites of four to six occupants.
 30 Macalester Street is one of the newest residence halls on campus, is more handicap-accessible than other residence halls and houses a small number of students. It is a quiet and substance-free living community.
 Wallace Hall is the campus's oldest residence hall, built in 1907 and renovated in 2002. It houses sophomores.

 Kirk Hall houses upperclassmen and is between the Campus Center and the Leonard Athletic Center. It contains singles, doubles, and triples. The doubles and triples each have a common room with singles branching off of it.
With the opening of the Institute for Global Citizenship, Summit House, which previously housed the International Center, has been converted into a residence hall housing 16 students.
 There are three cottages on campus.

Specialty housing
 Summit House: Across Snelling Avenue from Dupre Hall, the Summit House offers residence for up to 16 upperclassmen. Starting in fall 2011, the Summit House operated on a per-semester cycle exclusively for students studying abroad for half the school year.
 Veggie Co-op: Under the stadium bleachers, it houses 20 students who eat vegetarian meals together for most of the week. All food in the house is vegetarian. Students buy and make food together for their meals.
 Cultural House: At 37 Macalester Street, residents of the Cultural House are usually required to work or volunteer for the Department of Multicultural Life and engage in moving toward a more diverse, accepting, and open campus environment.
 All-gender housing (part of Kirk Hall)
 Eco-House : At 200 Vernon Street, Eco-House residents focus on environmentally friendly practices throughout their daily lives.
 Language Houses: Students are expected to speak the language of their particular house as much as possible. There are seven Language Houses, focusing on German, Japanese, French, Spanish, Russian, Mandarin, and Portuguese.
 Inter-Faith House: In section 8 of Kirk, the Inter-Faith House is for students wishing to explore faith in their lives and others'.

Food services
Food services on campus are provided by Bon Appétit, a national company. The cafeteria, in the Ruth Stricker Dayton Campus Center, is called Café Mac. Three different meal plans are available for students who live on campus. All freshmen are required to have the highest meal plan offered.

Sustainability
In the Sustainable Endowments Institute's 2011 College Sustainability Report Card, Macalester received an overall grade of A−, earning it recognition as an "Overall Campus Sustainability Leader". In 2011, The Association for the Advancement of Sustainability in Higher Education (AASHE) awarded Macalester a Sustainability Tracking, Assessment & Rating System (STARS) Silver Rating in recognition of its sustainability achievements.

Many student organizations focus on sustainability, including Macalester Conservation and Renewable Energy Society (MacCARES), Minnesota Public Interest Research Group (MPIRG), Mac Bike, Macalester Urban Land and Community Health (MULCH), and Outing Club.

In April 2003, Macalester installed a 10 kW Urban Wind Turbine on campus thanks to that year's senior class gift donating the installation cost and Xcel Energy donating the tower and turbine. MacCARES is developing a proposal for Macalester to invest in a Utility-Scale Wind Turbine in the range of 2MW. Other projects include the Eco-House, a student residence with a range of green features and research opportunities; a rain garden that prevents stormwater from running off into groundwater, a bike share program, and a veggie co-op. The Class of 2008 designated its senior class gift to a Sustainability Fund to support initiatives to improve environmental sustainability on campus and in the greater community. On January 1, 2013, Macalester started campus composting.

In September 2009, Macalester set a goal to become carbon-neutral by 2025 and Zero-Waste by 2020. The school is a signatory to the Talloires Declaration and the American College and University President's Climate Commitment, the latter obligating the college to work toward carbon neutrality. On April 18, 2012, President Brian Rosenberg signed the “Commitment to Sustainable Practices of Higher Education Institutions on the Occasion of the United Nations Conference on Sustainable Development”.

In 2009, Macalester opened Markim Hall, a LEED Platinum building that houses the school's Institute for Global Citizenship. The building uses 45% less water and 75% less energy than a typical Minnesota building. Macalester is planning to remodel its Music, Theater, and Art buildings and is designing them to Minnesota B3 Guidelines.

Recent sustainability efforts have highlighted the intersection of social justice and climate change at Macalester as well as the potential conflict between its on-campus sustainability and its investments. Since 2012, students have criticized the college for making significant endowment investments in fossil fuel companies, including direct investments in oil and gas private partnerships. The student organization Fossil Free Mac has led a campaign urging the college to divest from fossil fuel companies. The campaign initially proposed full endowment divestment from the top 200 publicly traded fossil fuel companies, which Macalester's Social Responsibility Committee rejected in 2015. In 2018, the Social Responsibility Committee unanimously approved a revised Fossil Free Mac proposal advocating a moratorium on the college's direct investment partnerships with oil and gas companies, which the board of trustees is considering. The divestment campaign has received significant support from the student body, student government, faculty, staff, and alumni.

Notable alumni 

 Jeremy Allaire, 1993, co-founder of Circle, the blockchain-based payments and treasury infrastructure company that created USDC
Kofi Annan, 1961, former UN secretary general and Nobel Peace Prize laureate
 Siah Armajani, 1963, sculptor
 Charles Baxter, 1969, University of Minnesota professor, author and National Book Award finalist (The Feast of Love)
 Peter Berg, 1983, actor, film director, (Friday Night Lights and Hancock). One scene in Hancock shows Charlize Theron wearing a Macalester t-shirt.
 Richard P. Binzel, 1980, astronomer and professor of planetary sciences at the Massachusetts Institute of Technology
 Amy Briggs, 1984, video game designer and creator of Plundered Hearts
 Mike Carr, 1973, creator of Dawn Patrol game, author of the classic Dungeons and Dragons adventure In Search of the Unknown, commodities trader
 Michael James Davis, 1969, Judge of the United States District Court for the District of Minnesota
 Chank Diesel, 1990, typographer
 Mark Doten, 2001, novelist and librettist, The Source, one of Granta's "Best of Young American Novelists."
 Ari Emanuel, 1983, talent agent, basis for the character Ari Gold (Entourage)
 William P. Gerberding, 1951, president of the University of Washington
 Danai Gurira, 2001, actress (The Walking Dead, Black Panther) and playwright
 Christy Haynes, 1998, award-winning Professor of Chemistry at University of Minnesota
 Marilyn Gayle Hoff, 1964, author, educator, activist
 Mary Karr, 1974, author New York Times Bestseller (The Liars' Club), Whiting Award winner, Guggenheim Fellow, Pushcart Awardee 
 Shawn Lawrence Otto, 1984, screenwriter and film producer (House of Sand and Fog)
 Carl Lumbly, 1973, actor (Cagney and Lacey and Alias)
 Walter Mondale, 1950, former vice president of the United States and U.S. ambassador to Japan (1993–97)
 Bob Mould, 1982, musician, guitarist, writer, and vocalist for Hüsker Dü and Sugar as well as a solo artist
 Tim O'Brien, 1968, author of The Things They Carried and the winner of the 1979 National Book Award for his novel Going After Cacciato
 Rebecca Otto, 1985, Minnesota State Auditor; former Minnesota House member (2003–04)
Fred Swaniker, 1999, co-founder African Leadership Academy
 DeWitt Wallace, 1911, founder of Reader's Digest, philanthropist
 Christopher O. Ward, 1976, executive director of the Port Authority of New York and New Jersey
 Robert Willis Warren, 1950, judge of the United States District Court for the Eastern District of Wisconsin
 Dave Zirin, 1996, political sportswriter

See also

 List of colleges and universities in Minnesota
 Higher education in Minnesota

References

Further reading
 Kilde, Jeanne Halgren. Nature and Revelation: A History of Macalester College (University of Minnesota Press, 2010) 400 pp.

External links

 Official website
 Official athletics website

 

 
Liberal arts colleges in Minnesota
Educational institutions established in 1874
Old Main, Macalester College
Universities and colleges in Saint Paul, Minnesota
1874 establishments in Minnesota
University and college buildings on the National Register of Historic Places in Minnesota
Private universities and colleges in Minnesota
Universities and colleges affiliated with the Presbyterian Church (USA)